Nancy Vallecilla (born November 24, 1957) is a retired female athlete from Ecuador, who competed in the hurdling events and the heptathlon.

She represented her native country twice at the Summer Olympics: 1980 and 1988.

Vallecilla finished fifth in the pentathlon at the 1979 Pan American Games as well as fourth (1987) and seventh (1979) in the 100 metres hurdles at the Pan American Games.

International competitions

References

sports-reference

1957 births
Living people
Ecuadorian female hurdlers
Ecuadorian heptathletes
Olympic athletes of Ecuador
Athletes (track and field) at the 1980 Summer Olympics
Athletes (track and field) at the 1988 Summer Olympics
Pan American Games competitors for Ecuador
Athletes (track and field) at the 1979 Pan American Games
Athletes (track and field) at the 1987 Pan American Games
World Athletics Championships athletes for Ecuador
South American Games gold medalists for Ecuador
South American Games silver medalists for Ecuador
South American Games bronze medalists for Ecuador
South American Games medalists in athletics
Competitors at the 1978 Southern Cross Games
21st-century Ecuadorian women
20th-century Ecuadorian women